Erramatti Mangamma (born 1 September 1946) is currently the oldest living person to give birth. She achieved this feat on 5 September 2019, giving birth to twin girls at the age of 73. The record for being the oldest mother in the world was previously held by Daljinder Kaur Gill who gave birth to a baby boy at the age of 72.

Biography 
Erramatti Mangamma married Sitarama Rajarao in 1962 in Andhra Pradesh, but the couple was reportedly unable to have children until Erramatti was impregnated using in-vitro fertilisation.

Pregnancy 
The couple are believed to have consulted several doctors for a period before Erramatti got pregnant after consulting a village doctor, Shanakkalaya Umashankar, in November 2018. The couple delivered twin girls for the first time after their marriage in 1962. Erramatti delivered her twins on 5 September 2019 after being conceived through the process of in-vitro fertilisation via C-section in the city of Hyderabad, making her the world's oldest mother and the oldest mother to give birth to twins.

See also 

Lina Medina
Pregnancy over age 50

References 

Human pregnancy
Living people
Maternity in India
1946 births